Ali Mabkhout is an Emirati professional footballer who has represented the United Arab Emirates national team since 2012. He made his first appearance for the UAE on 15 November 2009 at Tahnoun bin Mohammed Stadium in Al Ain against Czech Republic in a friendly match. As of November 2022, Mabkhout is the top scorer for his country with 80 goals in 109 appearances. He was top goalscorer in the 2022 FIFA World Cup qualification.

Since he made his first appearance for the national team in 2012, Mabkhout has been an instrumental member of the United Arab Emirates, being part of the side during the 2015 and 2019 AFC Asian Cup, as well as participating in FIFA World Cup qualification and regional tournaments like the Arabian Gulf Cup. On 31 August 2019, in a friendly game against Sri Lanka, Mabkhout opened the scoring with his 50th international goal, and went on to get a hat-trick in an eventual 5–1 win. This made Mabkhout only the second Emirati player in history to score 50 goals for the side after Adnan Al Talyani. On 10 October 2019, Mabkhout scored a hat-trick against Indonesia in a 5–0 win, to become UAE's all-time leading goalscorer.

List of goals
Scores and results list United Arab Emirates's goal tally first.

Statistics

Notes

See also 
 List of top international men's football goal scorers by country
 List of men's footballers with 50 or more international goals

References

Mabkhout
United Arab Emirates national football team
Mabkhout